Martin Monroe Azarow (July 4, 1934 – September 8, 2003) was an American film and television actor. He was known for playing the role of "Big Al" in the 1982 film They Call Me Bruce?.

Born in Brooklyn, New York. Azarow appeared in television programs including Taxi, Remington Steele, T.J. Hooker, It's a Living, L.A. Law, Hill Street Blues, St. Elsewhere, Charlie's Angels, Doogie Howser, M.D., The New Mike Hammer and Hooperman. He also appeared in films such as Some Kind of Hero, Mae West and Jo Jo Dancer, Your Life Is Calling.

Azarow died in September 2003 at Las Vegas, Nevada, at the age of 69.

Filmography

Film

Television

References

External links 

Rotten Tomatoes profile

1934 births
2003 deaths
People from Brooklyn
Male actors from New York City
American male television actors
American male film actors
20th-century American male actors
Burials at Southern Nevada Veterans Memorial Cemetery